

Hypsipetes is a genus of bulbuls, songbirds in the family Pycnonotidae. Most of its species occur in tropical forests around the Indian Ocean. But while the genus is quite diverse in the Madagascar region at the western end of its range it does not reach the African mainland.

Most Hypsipetes bulbuls are dark greyish birds with orange or red bills and feet. The feathers on top of the head are slightly elongated and usually black, and can be erected to form a short and wispy crest.

Taxonomy and systematics
The genus Hypsipetes was introduced in 1831 by the Irish zoologist Nicholas Aylward Vigors with Hypsipetes psaroides as the type species. This taxon is now a subspecies of the black bulbul Hypsipetes leucocephalus psaroides. The genus name combines the Ancient Greek hupsi meaning "high" with petēs meaning "-flyer".

Species
The genus contains 19 species:

 Philippine bulbul (Hypsipetes philippinus)
 Mindoro bulbul (Hypsipetes mindorensis)
 Streak-breasted bulbul (Hypsipetes siquijorensis)
 Seram golden bulbul (Hypsipetes affinis) 
 Northern golden bulbul	(Hypsipetes longirostris) 
 Buru golden bulbul (Hypsipetes mysticalis)
 Visayan bulbul (Hypsipetes guimarasensis)
 Yellowish bulbul (Hypsipetes everetti)
Camiguin bulbul (Hypsipetes catarmanensis)
 Zamboanga bulbul (Hypsipetes rufigularis) 
 Brown-eared bulbul (Hypsipetes amaurotis)
 Reunion bulbul (Hypsipetes borbonicus)
 Malagasy bulbul (Hypsipetes madagascariensis)
 Mauritius bulbul (Hypsipetes olivaceus)
 White-headed bulbul (Hypsipetes thompsoni)
 Black bulbul (Hypsipetes leucocephalus)
 Square-tailed bulbul (Hypsipetes ganeesa)
 Grand Comoro bulbul (Hypsipetes parvirostris)
 Moheli bulbul (Hypsipetes moheliensis)
 Seychelles bulbul (Hypsipetes crassirostris)

Extinct species
 †Rodrigues bulbul (Hypsipetes cowlesi)

Former species
Some authorities, either presently or formerly, recognize several additional species as belonging to the genus Hypsipetes including:
 Eastern bearded greenbul (as Hypsipetes malaccensis)
 Yellow-browed bulbul (as Hypsipetes indica or Hypsipetes indicus)
 Hairy-backed bulbul (as Hypsipetes criniger)
 Olive bulbul (as Hypsipetes virescens or Hypsipetes viridescens)
 Grey-eyed bulbul (as Hypsipetes propinquus)
 Buff-vented bulbul (as Hypsipetes olivacea)
 Sulphur-bellied bulbul (as Hypsipetes palawanensis)
 Nicobar bulbul (as Hypsipetes nicobariensis, Hypsipetes virescens, or Ixocincla virescens)
 Mountain bulbul (as Hypsipetes mcclellandi or Hypsipetes mcclellandii) was often included in Hypsipetes due to an error that was promoted in modern times by the Sibley taxonomy
 Mountain bulbul (tickelli) (as Hypsipetes tickelli) was often included in Hypsipetes due to an error that was promoted in modern times by the Sibley taxonomy
 Mountain bulbul (holtii) (as Hypsipetes holtii) was often included in Hypsipetes due to an error that was promoted in modern times by the Sibley taxonomy
 Streaked bulbul (as Hypsipetes malaccensis)
 Sunda bulbul (as Hypsipetes virescens) was often included in Hypsipetes due to an error that was promoted in modern times by the Sibley taxonomy
 Seram golden bulbul (as Hypsipetes affinis)
 Ashy bulbul (as Hypsipetes flavalus)
 Chestnut bulbul (as Hypsipetes castanonotus)
 White-headed bulbul (as Hypsipetes thompsoni)

Notes

References

Sources

 Gregory, Steven M. (2000): Nomenclature of the Hypsipetes Bulbuls (Pycnonotidae). Forktail 16: 164–166. PDF fulltext
 Moyle, Robert G. & Marks, Ben D. (2006): Phylogenetic relationships of the bulbuls (Aves: Pycnonotidae) based on mitochondrial and nuclear DNA sequence data. Mol. Phylogenet. Evol. 40(3): 687–695.  (HTML abstract)
 Pasquet, Éric; Han, Lian-Xian; Khobkhet, Obhas & Cibois, Alice (2001): Towards a molecular systematics of the genus Criniger, and a preliminary phylogeny of the bulbuls (Aves, Passeriformes, Pycnonotidae). Zoosystema 23(4): 857–863. PDF fulltext

 
Bulbuls
Bird genera
Taxonomy articles created by Polbot